On Resonant Shores (German: An klingenden Ufern) is a 1948 Austrian drama film directed by Hans Unterkircher and starring Marianne Schönauer, Curd Jürgens and Otto Tressler. The screenplay was by Alexander Lernet-Holenia who also wrote a novella based on the story. It was shot on location in the Austrian state of Carinthia including at Gurk Cathedral and around Lake Ossiach. The film's sets were designed by the art director Ernst Rampak. It was praised by Austrian film critics.

Synopsis
During the Second World War Maria Burg working as an auxiliary nurse meets a soldier in hospital, Stefan, who in civilian life was a painter. They fall in love but he is called away to the Eastern Front where is reported killed. A distraught Maria is then courted by and marries Alex, a composer, and settles with him in the Carinthian countryside.

When, unexpectedly, Stefan returns from the war alive he finds Maria no longer living in her old home, now a bombed-out house. By chance he is commissioned to do a religious painting of Saint Catherine for a monastery in Carinthia. He meets Maria again, after she is recommended to him as a model for the religious icon. However, there is not possibility of resuming their relationship because of her marriage to Alexander, who is in ill health due to his morphine addiction.

However, when Alexander dies Stefan and Maria are finally able to unite as a couple.

Cast
 Marianne Schönauer as Maria Burg 
 Curd Jürgens as Stefan Keller 
 Cäcilia Kahr  as Gabriele Wergeland 
 Otto Tressler as Abt 
 Karl Skraup as Onkel Benjamin 
 Hans Unterkircher as Alexander Varena 
 Elisabeth Markus as Frau Rainer 
 Rudolf Brix as Kilian 
 Oskar Hugelmann as Wirt 
 Hugo Gottschlich as Franz Hofer 
 Karl Köstler as Untersuchungsrichter 
 Paul Horn as Stabsarzt 
 Adolf Ario as Unteeroffizier

References

Bibliography 
 Fritsche, Maria. Homemade Men in Postwar Austrian Cinema: Nationhood, Genre and Masculinity. Berghahn Books, 2013.
 Von Dassanowsky, Robert. Austrian Cinema: A History. McFarland, 2005.

External links 
 

1948 films
Austrian drama films
1948 drama films
1940s German-language films
Films directed by Hans Unterkircher
Austrian black-and-white films
Sascha-Film films